Aleksei Alekseyev may refer to:

 Aleksei Andreyevich Alekseyev (born 1988), Russian football (soccer) player
 Aleksei Petrovich Alekseyev (1915–1998), Russian actor